Whitehorse Manor Junior School is a junior school for pupils aged between seven and eleven years. The school is located in Thornton Heath. In April 2011 the school became part of the first Academy Trust in Croydon and the running of the school became part of the responsibility of the Pegasus Academy Trust, a public company limited by guarantee. The Executive Headteachers of The Pegasus Academy Trust are Jolyon Roberts and Lynne Sampson. The school caters for pupils from Year 3 to Year 6. The uniform of the school is a burgundy sweatshirt with the school logo, white shirt and grey trousers or skirt. The school is expanding the number of forms on entry from two to three. There are currently 450 pupils on roll with a maximum of 30 pupils in each of 15 classes. To cater for these extra children a major building project took place between April 2010 and April 2014 providing seven extra classrooms, new offices, extended hall and library. The scheme was designed by the architects Hayhurst and Co and won a RIBA London award in May 2014. The current Head of School is Nina Achenbach BA (QTS), NPQH.

History 
The school was opened in 1892 and has a complicated history - having undergone a great many re-organisations. Dr Ron Cox, a consultant archivist to the Education Department of the London Borough of Croydon, lists the chronological story as follows:

 1892-1911Three schools (apart from the infants) opened on the Whitehorse Road site: Whitehorse Road Junior (Mixed) school, Whitehorse Road Senior boys' school, Whitehorse Road Senior girls' school.
 1911-1930In 1911 Whitehorse Road Junior (Mixed) school closed and the pupils moved into the respective boys and girls departments of the two senior schools, therefore, giving Whitehorse Road (Post-Infants) boys' school and
Whitehorse Road (Post-Infants) girls' school.
 In 1921 as part of a general re-organisation of school names the Whitehorse Road schools were re-designated "Whitehorse Manor".
 1930-1955In 1930 there was a substantial re-organisation. All the Whitehorse Manor senior girls moved to another local school, Ecclesbourne, and all the Ecclesbourne senior boys moved to Whitehorse Manor. All the Whitehorse Manor junior boys moved to Ecclesbourne and all the Ecclesbourne junior girls moved to Whitehorse Manor. On the Whitehorse Manor site, this left Whitehorse Manor Senior (later secondary modern) boys' school and Whitehorse Manor Junior girls' school.
 1955-1961In 1955, the headmaster of the boys school during this period was Mr pavey who had returned from retirement, other teachers such as miss chivers and Mrs edworthy, this was the last year's as a boys only school which became mixed after
 1961 to 2011 in 1961 both the boys and girls school amalgamated and have been mixed ever since
From April 2011  The school became part of the Pegasus Academy Trust.

Agnes Mason, an associate of D. H. Lawrence taught at this school for some years until Davidson Road School opened in 1907 when she went there to teach with Lawrence. A penetrating description of the school and its staff at that time is to be found in Helen Corke's book In our infancy:an autobiography, Part 1 1882-1912. She too was an associate of Lawrence.

Headteachers 
The Headteachers of the school have been:

Whitehorse Manor Junior School 1892-1911

Headteachers of Whitehorse Manor Senior Girls' School 1892-1961

Headteachers of Whitehorse Manor Senior Boys' School 1892-1955

After spending some years as Headteacher of Sydenham Junior Boys Mr Alfred Gregory returned as Headteacher of the new Junior (Mixed) school in 1961

Headteachers of Whitehorse Manor Junior (Mixed) School

In April 2011 the school became part of the Pegasus Academy Trust together with Whitehorse Manor Infant School and Ecclesbourne Primary School. The Executive Headteachers of The Pegasus Academy Trust are Jolyon Roberts and Lynne Sampson

Head of School of Whitehorse Manor Junior (Academy) School

Gallery

References

External links
Official Website
Performance Tables
 Croydon local studies library where many of the school's documents from 1892 to present are now held
 Hayhurst and Co. - architects of new buildings completed April 2014
 Local press comment on RIBA London award

Primary schools in the London Borough of Croydon
Educational institutions established in 1892
Academies in the London Borough of Croydon
1892 establishments in England
Thornton Heath